Kwami Hodouto (born 31 October 1974) is a Togolese former professional footballer who played for French clubs AS Cannes, AJ Auxerre, Red Star Saint-Ouen,, and Olympique Noisy-le-Sec, and English club Huddersfield Town.

References

1974 births
Living people
Togolese footballers
Association football defenders
Ligue 1 players
Ligue 2 players
Championnat National players
Championnat National 2 players
English Football League players
AS Cannes players
AJ Auxerre players
Red Star F.C. players
Huddersfield Town A.F.C. players
Olympique Noisy-le-Sec players
21st-century Togolese people